The Outlaw Tamer is a 1935 American western film directed by J.P. McGowan and starring Lane Chandler, Blanche Mehaffey and George 'Gabby' Hayes.

Synopsis
A posse on the trail of masked bandit loses the trail of the wounded man. He shelters at Jean Bennett's store and assists her and old gold prospector Cactus Barnes when they run into difficulties.

Cast
 Lane Chandler as 'Tex' Broderick
 Blanche Mehaffey as Jean Bennett 
 J.P. McGowan as 	Sheriff Jim Porter
 Slim Whitaker as 	Bowie Harris 
 Ben Corbett as	Deputy Bud McClure 
 George 'Gabby' Hayes as 	Cactus Barnes
 Maston Williams as Blackie, Henchman
 Richard Cramer as 	Posse Sheriff
 Gertrude Chorre as 	Indian Servant

References

Bibliography
 Pitts, Michael R. Poverty Row Studios, 1929–1940. McFarland & Company, 2005.

External links
 

1935 films
1935 Western (genre) films
American Western (genre) films
Films directed by J. P. McGowan
American black-and-white films
Revisionist Western (genre) films
1930s English-language films
1930s American films